John Adam Quackenbush (October 15, 1828 – May 11, 1908) was a U.S. Republican politician from New York.

Biography
John A. Quackenbush was born in Schaghticoke, New York on October 15, 1828.  He was educated locally, graduated from Stillwater Academy and became a farmer, also becoming active in other ventures including a lumber business.

A Republican, he was Schaghticoke's Town Supervisor from 1860 to 1862, also serving as Chairman of the Rensselaer County Board of Supervisors.  Quackenbush was a member of the New York State Assembly (Rensselaer Co., 2nd D.) in 1863.  From 1873 to 1876 Quackenbush was Sheriff of Rensselaer County.

Quackenbush was elected as a United States Representative in 1888 and again in 1890, serving from March 4, 1889, to March 3, 1893.  He was an unsuccessful candidate for reelection in 1892, afterwards living in retirement in Schaghticoke.

He died in Schaghticoke on May 11, 1908, and was buried in Schaghticoke's Elmwood Cemetery.

References

Sources

 Hudson Valley Times, Obituary, John A. Quackenbush, May 13, 1908

1828 births
1908 deaths
Town supervisors in New York (state)
Sheriffs of Rensselaer County, New York
Republican Party members of the New York State Assembly
People from Schaghticoke, New York
Republican Party members of the United States House of Representatives from New York (state)
19th-century American politicians